Leda is a river in north-western Germany in the state of Lower Saxony.

The Leda is a right tributary of the Ems and originates at the confluence of the Sagter Ems and the Dreyschloot (a branch of the Soeste) near Barßel. The Leda flows into the Ems near the town of Leer. On the southern bank of the Leda, in the Overledingen Land (Overledingen="country over the Leda"), opposite Leer, lies the small settlement of Kloster Muhde (Muhde from the Old Frisian mutha meaning "(river) mouth").

In East Frisia the Sagter Ems, a headstream of the Leda, is also known as the Leda.

See also
List of rivers of Lower Saxony

References

 
Rivers of Lower Saxony
Federal waterways in Germany
Rivers of Germany